Jan Fornal (born 14 January 1995) is a Polish volleyball player. He competed for Poland at the 2013 U19 World Championship in Mexico. At the professional club level, he plays for Projekt Warsaw.

Personal life
His father Marek is a former volleyball player, Polish Champion (1988, 1989). He has a younger brother Tomasz (born 1997), who also plays volleyball professionally.

Sporting achievements

Youth national team
 2013  CEV U19 European Championship

References

External links
 
 Player profile at PlusLiga.pl 
 Player profile at Volleybox.net

1995 births
Living people
Sportspeople from Szczecin
Polish men's volleyball players
MKS Będzin players
Projekt Warsaw players
Outside hitters